Robert Alexander Campbell (September 2, 1832 – April 2, 1926) was a nineteenth-century politician, lawyer and businessman from Missouri.  He was Lieutenant Governor of Missouri from 1881 to 1885.

Biography
Campbell was born in Bowling Green, Missouri on September 2, 1832.Centennial History of Missouri, Vol 4, p. 5-9 (1921)  He studied three years of college at Illinois College in Jacksonville, Illinois, and left in his senior year in 1852, though the college awarded him a degree much later in his life in 1908.  After teaching school for one term he went to California with his father and worked in ranching and mining for two years.  He returned to Missouri in 1854, and eventually studied law and was admitted to the bar in 1860.  He fought in the Civil War and then returned to law practice until 1869, when he moved into railroads through 1877.  He served in the Missouri general assembly starting in 1869, and was eventually named speaker pro tem.  He was elected lieutenant governor in 1880.  In 1885 he was elected comptroller of St. Louis, serving until 1889, when he was then appointed to be a criminal court judge in St. Louis.  After that position, he retired. 

He died in St. Louis, Missouri on April 2, 1926.History of the Office of Lieutenant Governor, Office of Missouri Lieutenant Governor, retrieved 4 March 2022

References

1832 births
1926 deaths
People from Bowling Green, Missouri
Missouri Democrats
Lieutenant Governors of Missouri
19th-century American politicians
Illinois College alumni